The Tasmanian opium poppy farming industry was established in Tasmania in 1966.

Farms in Tasmania produce about 50% of the world's licit poppy straw that is later refined into opiates such as morphine and codeine.

Tasmanian Alkaloids is Tasmania's largest corporate grower of opium poppies.

A downy mildew outbreak in the 2014 poppy-growing season led to one Tasmanian company to look into growing poppies in the Northern Territory and Victoria of Australia.

References

External links
 Know your poppies factsheet from Department of Natural Resources and Environment (Tasmania) website
Opium in Australia
Agriculture in Tasmania
1966 establishments in Australia